Cheick Ibrahim Comara (born 14 October 1993) is an Ivorian professional footballer who plays for Saudi Arabian club Al-Arabi and the Ivory Coast national team. He participated in the 2017 FIFA Club World Cup with Wydad Casablanca, representing the CAF.

Career statistics

International

References

External links
 
 

1993 births
Living people
Academie de Foot Amadou Diallo players
Association football defenders
Ivorian footballers
Ivory Coast international footballers
Ekenäs IF players
Wydad AC players
Al-Arabi SC (Saudi Arabia) players
Saudi First Division League players
Expatriate footballers in Finland
Expatriate footballers in Morocco
Expatriate footballers in Saudi Arabia
Ivorian expatriates in Finland
Ivorian expatriates in Morocco
Ivorian expatriates in Saudi Arabia
2019 Africa Cup of Nations players
Ivory Coast A' international footballers
2016 African Nations Championship players